Pseudohadena magnitudinis is a moth of the family Noctuidae which is endemic to Iran.

References

Moths described in 2002
Endemic fauna of Iran
Xyleninae
Moths of the Middle East